Odsonne Édouard (born 16 January 1998) is a French professional footballer who plays as a forward for Premier League club Crystal Palace.

Having progressed through the youth ranks of AF Bobigny, Édouard signed with Paris Saint-Germain in July 2011 before being loaned to fellow Ligue 1 side Toulouse for the 2016–17 season. The following season, he was loaned to Celtic, where he won the domestic treble, before joining them on a permanent move for a club record fee.

He has also represented France at various youth levels and was a key player for the country at the 2015 UEFA European Under-17 Championship, where he won both the Golden Player and Golden Boot awards.

Club career

Paris Saint-Germain

Early career
Édouard joined the Paris Saint-Germain Academy in 2011 from amateur side AF Bobigny. His first noticeable achievement was during the 2013–14 season when he was the club's top goalscorer at U17 level; scoring 25 goals in 22 appearances in the U17 National Championship. He scored 22 goals in 14 league appearances for the U17s the following season and was part of the squad which won the Al Kass Cup, ending the competition with a return of three goals in five appearances. He also represented the club's U19, playing two UEFA Youth League matches, a Coupe Gambardella match and seven U19 Championship matches during which he scored seven goals. In two years, he scored more than 60 goals for the club at youth level, earning him the nicknames of "The Rocket" and "Magic Odsonne".

During the 2015–16 season, Édouard played with both the U19 team and the CFA team. In January 2016, he won the 2015 Titi d'Or, an award voted for by the club's supporters for the best academy player for a particular season. The award was notably won by players such as Kingsley Coman and Jean-Kévin Augustin in previous years. PSG also made it to the Youth League final but were ultimately beaten 2–1 by Chelsea. Édouard scored three goals and registered three assists during the competition.

On 27 April 2016, he signed a professional contract with Paris Saint-Germain's senior side. During the 2016–17 pre-season, Édouard was included in PSG's squad for the 2016 International Champions Cup. Having previously featured as a substitute, he came on in the 79th minute against Leicester and scored in his non-competitive debut, making it 4–0 in the closing minutes of the club's last International Champions Cup game. As a result of the victory, PSG were crowned International Champions Cup champions.

Loan to Toulouse
On 8 August 2016, Édouard joined Toulouse on a season-long loan. He made his debut for the club on 14 August 2016 against Marseille, replacing Issiaga Sylla after 74 minutes in a 0–0 away draw. Édouard scored his first professional goal on 19 November against Metz, scoring a consolation goal late in added time in a 2–1 home loss.

On 30 March 2017, Édouard was suspected of having shot at a passer-by with an airsoft gun on 11 February, injuring him in the head. As a result of the incident, he was interrogated by police and his loan was prematurely terminated by Toulouse. At the time of his loan being cancelled, Édouard had made 17 appearances and scored one goal for the club. It was later revealed that his teammate, Mathieu Cafaro, had confessed to being the one who had fired the gun. Cafaro later recanted, however, and on 13 June the Toulouse Prosecutor asked that Édouard be charged with a four months suspended prison sentence and a €6,000 fine for his involvement in the incident. Édouard alleged that Cafaro fired the shot while Cafaro claimed not to have been in the car at the time of the shooting. On 4 July, Édouard was sentenced to a suspended four months' prison sentence by the Correctional Court of Toulouse. He was also ordered to pay a fine of €6,000 as well as damages of €2,600 to the victim for the wounds suffered to his ear.

Celtic

2017–18 season: Loan from Paris Saint-Germain
Édouard signed for Scottish Premiership club Celtic on 31 August 2017 on a season-long loan. He scored on his debut away to Hamilton Academical on 8 September, helping Celtic to a 4–1 victory. Later that year, on 2 December, he scored his first career hat-trick in a 5–1 win over Motherwell at Celtic Park. He made his UEFA Champions League debut three days later, coming on as a substitute for compatriot Moussa Dembélé in a group stage defeat to Anderlecht.

On 11 March 2018, he scored the winning goal in the 69th minute of a 3–2 win over rivals Rangers at Ibrox Stadium, and on 29 April he added two more goals in a 5–0 win over the same opposition to seal Celtic's seventh consecutive league title. He ultimately made 29 appearances for the season and scored 11 times as Celtic completed a domestic treble.

2018–19 season 
On 15 June 2018, Édouard signed a four-year contract with Celtic for a fee that the club said was the highest in their history. The amount would have had to have exceeded the £6 million that the club paid for Chris Sutton and John Hartson in 2000 and 2001, respectively, with sources estimating it as over £8 million. The following month he was named on the 100-man shortlist for the 2018 Golden Boy award; he was the only footballer playing in Scotland to be nominated for the accolade. In his first game of the season, Édouard scored the opening goal in a 3–0 win over Alashkert in the first qualifying round of the 2018–19 UEFA Champions League. He continued his scoring run in the following round, netting twice in a 3–1 victory against Rosenborg at Celtic Park with manager Brendan Rodgers describing him as a 'top striker' after his displays.

In March 2019, he scored two goals and made one assist in three league matches, scoring a goal against Dundee and scored a goal and made an assist against Rangers to grant Celtic wins in both matches. He subsequently won the Scottish Premiership Player Of The Month for March 2019, first in his of career based on his performance. On 25 May 2019, Édouard scored twice as Celtic beat Hearts to secure the Scottish Cup and a historic "treble treble", that is, winning the Scottish Premiership, the Scottish League Cup, and the Scottish Cup in three consecutive years.

2019–20 season 
In September 2019, Édouard was adjudged the Scottish Premiership Player Of The Month for August 2019, after he netted in the 7–0 win over St Johnstone and 5–2 victory over Motherwell. In November he suffered from a minor injury, described as a "niggle" by manager Neil Lennon, who later said Édouard should be fit to play in the League Cup final. In January 2020, he scored three goals in three league games, a goal against Kilmarnock and a brace against Ross County to help Celtic extend their lead in the league and win the Scottish Premiership Player Of The Month for January.

Édouard was the top goalscorer with 22 goals in the 2019–20 Scottish Premiership, which was curtailed due to the COVID-19 pandemic. He was later adjudged as the SFWA Footballer of the Year for 2019–20 becoming the first French player to win that award and Celtic Player of the Year.

2020–21 season 

In March 2021, Édouard was awarded Scottish Premiership Player Of The Month for February 2021, after scoring 7 goals in 7 league matches including braces against St. Johnstone and Kilmarnock. Eventhough Celtic ended the 2020–21 season trophyless, Édouard however won the top scorer award in the 2020–21 Scottish Premiership in a second consecutive season and was named on the PFA team of the year. He ended the season with 22 goals in 40 matches in all competitions. In August 2021, he left Celtic and joined Crystal Palace. At the time of his departure, he was second highest ever scorer in the Scottish Premiership with 66 goals in 116 matches behind only Leigh Griffiths. His ratio of 0.57 was the highest on the all time table.

During his 4 year stay, he played 179 matches in all competitions and scored 88 goals, winning the Scottish Premiership on three occasions and the Scottish Cup and Scottish League Cup twice.

Crystal Palace
On 31 August 2021, transfer deadline day, Édouard signed for Premier League club Crystal Palace on a four-year contract. He made his debut on 11 September in a 3–0 victory over Tottenham Hotspur, when he came off the bench for Christian Benteke in the 84th minute and scored two goals.

International career
After his impressive performances at club level, Édouard was selected by coach Jean-Claude Guitini for the 2015 UEFA European Under-17 Championship, which France went on to win, scoring 15 goals and only conceding twice. Édouard was crowned as the Golden Player and the top goalscorer after scoring eight of France's 15 goals in five matches, a record in the competition. He notably scored the match-winning hat-trick in the final against Germany.

Personal life
Édouard was born in Kourou, French Guiana and has a sister. The family moved to Paris when he was six. His mother was a cleaner, his father is a postal worker.

In 2017, while on loan at Toulouse, Édouard was convicted of violence with a weapon, after he shot a passer-by with an air-rifle from his car, leaving him deaf; Édouard was ordered to pay €24,000 in damages, which was unpaid as of 2021. Additionally, Édouard received a four-month suspended sentence.

Career statistics

Honours
Paris Saint-Germain U19
Championnat National U19: 2015–16
UEFA Youth League runner-up: 2015–16

Celtic
Scottish Premiership: 2017–18, 2018–19, 2019–20
Scottish Cup: 2018–19, 2019–20
Scottish League Cup: 2018–19, 2019–20

France U17
UEFA European Under-17 Championship: 2015

Individual
SFWA Footballer of the Year: 2019–20
 PFA Scotland Team of the Year: 2020–21 Scottish Premiership
 Scottish Premiership Top Scorer: 2019–20, 2020–21
Scottish Premiership Player Of The Month: March 2019, August 2019, January 2020, February 2021
UEFA European Under-17 Championship Golden Player: 2015
UEFA European Under-17 Championship top scorer: 2015
UEFA European Under-17 Championship Team of the Tournament: 2015
Celtic Player of the Year: 2019–20
Titi d'Or: 2015

References

External links

Profile at the Crystal Palace F.C. website

1998 births
Living people
People from Kourou
French footballers
France youth international footballers
France under-21 international footballers
French Guianan footballers
Association football forwards
Football Club 93 Bobigny-Bagnolet-Gagny players
Paris Saint-Germain F.C. players
Toulouse FC players
Celtic F.C. players
Crystal Palace F.C. players
Ligue 1 players
Scottish Professional Football League players
Premier League players
Scottish league football top scorers
French expatriate footballers
Expatriate footballers in Scotland
Expatriate footballers in England
French expatriate sportspeople in Scotland
French expatriate sportspeople in England
Black French sportspeople
French people of French Guianan descent